Vokoun (feminine: Vokounová) is a surname of Czech origin. Notable people with the surname include:

Jan Vokoun (1887–?), Czech cyclist
Kamila Vokoun Hájková (born 1987), Czech ice dancer
Pavel Vokoun (born 1970), Czech swimmer
Tomáš Vokoun (born 1976), Czech ice hockey player

References

See also
 

Czech-language surnames